The Sd.kfz. 11/1 or Selbstfahrlafette (Sd. Kfz. 11/1) für 2 cm Flak 38 auf le. Zgkw. 3t mit Panzerschutz was a German half track manufactured for the German military during the Second World War. There was an earlier vehicle with this designation, the Nebelkraftwagen Sd. Kfz. 11/1, an ammunition carrier for the Nebelwerfer mortar carrier. When that vehicle was no longer being made, the designation was then used for this vehicle.

Design 
The half track chassis has a similar original design to the Sd.Kfz. 251, so is sometimes mistaken for it. It is fundamentally an Anti Aircraft half track, with the front half armoured, and the back part a flat bed, upon which is mounted a 2 cm flak gun. By March 1945 a total of 644 vehicles had been manufactured. It was crewed by 5, and powered by a Maybach HL42 TUKRM engine, reaching top road speeds of 53 km/h and a range of 250 km on road. Front armour was 15mm, side armour 8mm.

Operational Use 
The vehicle saw action on the Eastern Front, in particular during the period when the Russian Air Force gained air dominance.

Surviving Vehicles 
Only one example of this Half track is known to exist. It arrived at the  Australian Armour and Artillery Museum, Cairns, Australia on the 28th of February 2020 , and has been restored to a fully operational state.

External links 
 Photos at Selbstfahrlafette (Sd. Kfz. 11/1) für 2cm Flak 38 auf le. Zgkw. 3t mit Panzerschutz, at Kfz. der Wehrmacht

References 
 Chamberlain, Peter, and Hilary L. Doyle. Thomas L. Jentz (Technical Editor). Encyclopedia of German Tanks of World War Two: A Complete Illustrated Directory of German Battle Tanks, Armoured Cars, Self-propelled Guns, and Semi-tracked Vehicles, 1933–1945. London: Arms and Armour Press, 1978 (revised edition 1993). 
 Niehorster, Leo W. G. German World War II Organizational Series, Vol. 4/II: Mechanized GHQ units and Waffen-SS Formations (28th June 1942) Milton Keyes, Buckinghamshire: Military Press, 2004
 Spielberger, Walter J. Halftracked Vehicles of the German Army 1909-1945. Atlgen, PA: Schiffer, 2008 

Half-tracks of Germany